Großrückerswalde is a municipality in the district Erzgebirgskreis, in Saxony, Germany.

It contains:
 Großrückerswalde with 
 Mauersberg
 
 
 
 Wolfsberg

References

External links 

Erzgebirgskreis